David Cerda (born June 13, 1961, Hammond, Indiana) is an American performer and playwright based in Chicago, Illinois. He is currently the Artistic Director for Hell In A Handbag Productions, which he co-founded in 2002. His campy, highly theatrical plays have made him an infamous icon within the Chicago theater scene. He has written and appeared in many of his works including a transgressive adaptation of Rudolph, the Red-Hosed Reindeer, How ‘What Ever Happened to Baby Jane?’ Happened and POSEIDON! An Upside-Down Musical which won the New York International Fringe Festival Best Ensemble Award and was the most attended show of the festival that year.

His most recent works include The Drag Seed, A Showgirls Musical, an updated version of POSEIDON! An Upside Down Musical, and The Golden Girls-The Lost Episodes. The Golden Girls Lost Episodes series began in 2017 and has been continuously updated with new editions.

References

External links
 Hell In A Handbag Productions

American gay writers
20th-century American dramatists and playwrights
Writers from Chicago
Living people
1961 births
American LGBT dramatists and playwrights
American male dramatists and playwrights
20th-century American male writers
21st-century American LGBT people